Gawri (ګاوری), also known as Kalami (کالامي), or Bashkarik, is an Indo-Aryan language spoken in Swat Kohistan (also called Kalam) region in the upper Swat District and in the upper Panjkora river valley of Upper Dir District, Khyber Pakhtunkhwa, Pakistan.

Classification
According to its genealogical classification (Strand, 1973:302 and 2004), Gawri belongs to the Kohistani subgroup of the north-western zone of Indo-Aryan languages, along with several closely related languages in its geographical vicinity: Torwali (in Swat south of Kalam), Indus Kohistani, Bateri, Chilisso, and Gawro (the latter four east of Kalam in Indus Kohistan). Together with a range of other north-western Indo-Aryan mountain languages, these languages are sometimes collectively referred to as ‘Dardic’ languages.

Geographic distribution
Gawri is one of about thirty languages that are spoken in the mountain areas of northern Pakistan. Kohistan is a Persian word that means ‘land of mountains’ and Kohistani can be translated as ‘mountain language’. As a matter of fact, there are several distinct languages in the area that are all popularly called Kohistani. The language under study in this paper is spoken in the upper parts of the valley of the Swat River, in the
Khyber Pakhtunkhwa Province of Pakistan. The name of the principal village of this area is Kalam, and hence the area is known as Kalam Kohistan. In the older linguistic literature, the language of Kalam Kohistan is referred to as Bashkarik (Morgenstierne, 1940), or as Garwi or Gawri (Grierson, 1919; Barth & Morgenstierne, 1958). These names are hardly, if at all, known to the speakers of the language themselves, who normally just call their language Kohistani. However, very recently a number of intellectuals belonging to a local cultural society have started to call their language Gawri, a name that has old historical roots.

The same language is also spoken across the mountains to the West of Kalam Kohistan, in the upper reaches of the Panjkora river valley of Upper Dir District. When added together, the two Kalam-Kohistani-speaking communities comprised over 200,000 people.

Phonology

Vowels

Length and nasalization are probably contrastive for all vowels.

Consonants

After the front vowels , the velars  are palatalized: .

Tone
Gawri has contrastive tones.

Grammar

Syntax
The default sentence order is SOV, but this can be changed for emphasis.

Morphology
Approximately 50% of Gawri words can not be broken down to smaller morphological forms. Of the other half, most words are made up of about two to three morphemes. This language implements many modifications to the stem as opposed to using distinct morpheme additions. For example, many plural words are formed by changing the stem of words as opposed to modifying with a plural morpheme.

Words can also be modified by suffixes and prefixes.

See also 
 Indus Kohistani language

References

Further reading
 
 Baart, Joan and Muhammad Zaman Sagar. 2020. THE GAWRI LANGUAGE OF KALAM AND DIR KOHISTAN. Online access
 Zaman, S. M., & Baart, J. L. (2004). Gaawri zaban-o-adab (Inmal Haq Javed ed.). Islamabad: Department of Pakistani Languages, Allama Iqbal Open University. 
 Stahl, J. L. (1988). Multilingualism in Kalam Kohistan. 
 Rensch, C. R., Decker, S. J., & Hallberg, D. G. (1992). Patterns of languages use among the Kohistanis of the Swat Valley. Languages of Kohistan. Islamabad, Pakistan: National Institute of Pakistan Studies Quaid-i-Azam University. 
 Lothers, M. D. (1996). Deixis in Kalam Kohistani narrative discourse. 
 Barth, F., & Morgenstierne, G. (1954). Vocabularies and specimens of some S.E. Dardic dialects. Oslo: Universitets forleget
 Baart, J.L. (2006). Report on local names and uses of plants in Kalam Kohistan. FLI Language and Culture Series, Anthropology.

External links
 Gawri Community Development Programme, contains various materials in and about the language
  The Gawri Language of Kalam and Dir Kohistan
 Tone and song in Kalam Kohistani
 A Sketch of Kalam Kohistani Grammar
 Names of Plants in Kalam Kohistani (Pakistan)
 The Gawri Language of Kalam and Dir Kohistani
 Kalam Kohistani Texts
 Tribes of the Hindoo Koosh
 LAPSyD Online page for Kalami
 SOCIOLINGUISTIC SURVEY OF NORTHERN PAKISTAN
 Endangered Languages Project

Dardic languages
Languages of Khyber Pakhtunkhwa